Scout Motors Inc. is an automotive marque of the Volkswagen Group. The brand was established in May 2022 to produce off-road capable electric vehicles. The company is building a factory in South Carolina, where it will produce its first two vehicles, a small SUV and pickup truck that are scheduled to be launched in late 2026.

History
The Scout marque is named after the off-road vehicle International Harvester Scout, produced from 1961 to 1980, which Volkswagen has owned since 2020 through its American truck subsidiary Navistar International.

On May 11, 2022, Volkswagen AG announced the creation of a new brand, Scout, dedicated to electric vehicles, designed, developed, manufactured and marketed in the United States.

On March 3, 2023, Scout Motors announced plans to build a $2 billion factory capable of producing 200,000 EVs a year in Blythewood, South Carolina. The factory will manufacture the company's first two vehicles: a small off-road focused SUV and a pickup truck that are scheduled to be launched in late 2026.

References 

Volkswagen Group
Vehicle manufacturing companies established in 2022
Car brands
Battery electric vehicle manufacturers
Electric vehicle manufacturers of the United States
American companies established in 2022